The 2018 Women's U23 Pan-American Volleyball Cup was the fourth edition of the bi-annual women's volleyball tournament. It was held in Lima, Peru from 14 to 19 August among eight national U23 teams.

Pools composition

Pool standing procedure
 Number of matches won
 Match points
 Points ratio
 Sets ratio
 Result of the last match between the tied teams

Match won 3–0: 5 match points for the winner, 0 match points for the loser
Match won 3–1: 4 match points for the winner, 1 match point for the loser
Match won 3–2: 3 match points for the winner, 2 match points for the loser

Preliminary round
All times are in Peru Time (UTC−05:00)

Group A

Group B

Final round

Championship bracket

5th–8th places bracket

Quarterfinals

Classification 5th–8th

Semifinals

7th place match

5th place match

3rd place match

Final

Final standing

Gaila González,
Vielka Peralta,
Camila de la Rosa,
Natalia Martínez,
Angelica Hinojosa,
Geraldine González,
Yokaty Pérez,
Yanlis Feliz,
Larysmer Martínez,
Brayelin Martínez,
Jineiry Martínez,
Yaneirys Rodríguez

Individual awards

Most Valuable Player

Best Scorer

Best Spiker

Best Middle Blocker

Best Setter

Best Opposite

Best Libero

Best Digger

Best Receiver

Best Server

References

Women's Pan-American Volleyball Cup
U23 Pan-American Volleyball Cup
International volleyball competitions hosted by Peru
Pan